Glen Rose High School may refer to the following schools:

Glen Rose High School (Arkansas)
Glen Rose High School (Texas)

See also 
 Glen Rose School District, Arkansas
 Glen Rose Independent School District, Texas